Graff may refer to:

 Graff (lunar crater)
 Graff (Martian crater)
 Graff (jewellers), jewelry boutique specializing in rare diamonds
 2009 Graff Diamonds robbery, which took place at the above store
 Graff, Minnesota an unincorporated community in Moose Lake Township, Cass County, Minnesota, United States
 Graff, Missouri, an unincorporated community in eastern Wright County, Missouri, United States

People with the surname 
 Anton Graff (1736–1813), a German painter
 Frederick Graff (1775-1847), American hydraulic engineer
 Garrett Graff (born 1981), an American journalist and author
 Gerald Graff (born 1937), an American professor
 Henry Graff (1921–2020), an American historian and writer
 Hyrum Graff, a character in Orson Scott Card's Ender books
 Ilene Graff (born 1949), an American actress
 Johann Michael Graff, a German Rococo sculptor and plasterer
 Kasimir Graff (1878–1950), a German astronomer
 Laurence Graff, an English jeweller
 Ludwig von Graff (1851–1924), a Hungarian-Austrian zoologist
 Michael Graff, an American computer engineer
 Patricio Graff (born 1975), Argentine footballer
 Randy Graff (born 1955), an American actress
 Suzanne Graff, an American actress
 Todd Graff (born 1959), an American actor
 Wilton Graff (1903–1969), an American actor

See also 
 De Graff (disambiguation)
 Graf (disambiguation)
 Graph (disambiguation)
 Grof (disambiguation)
 Groff (disambiguation)